The 2020 season was Petaling Jaya City FC's 17th season since its establishment in 2004. The club participated in the Malaysia Super League for the 2nd time since 2019.

Players

Current squad

Out on loan

Transfers

Transfers in

From youth squad

Transfers out

Squad statistics

Appearances and goals

|-
!colspan="14"|Players away from the club on loan:                     

|-
!colspan="14"|Players who left club during the season:
|}

References

Petaling Jaya City FC
Petaling Jaya City FC seasons
2020 in Malaysian football
Petaling Jaya City